Gemeni is a 2002 Indian Telugu-language action film directed by Saran and produced by M. Saravanan on AVM Productions.It stars Venkatesh and Namitha  and music composed by RP Patnaik. It is a remake of the Tamil film Gemini, released the same year. The film's title was spelt Gemeni to differentiate from the original Tamil version.

Plot
Gemeni and Ladda, are two contemporary gangsters in Vijayawada. Gemeni's friend is murdered by Ladda's friend. Then Gemeni and his gang search for the person who murdered his friend and kills him. This incident marks the start of their rivalry.

Meanwhile, Gemeni meets Manisha Natwarlal and falls in love with her. To gain her affections, he goes to study in an evening college as her classmate, and eventually, she too falls in love with him.

Gemeni and Ladda clash again for a market holdout. Using his brilliant tactics, Gemeni fools and wins against Ladda which drives him crazy. In the meantime, Vijayawada gets a new Police Commissioner in Narendranath Chowdary. He arrests both Gemeni and Ladda. Understanding their rivalry, Narendranath puts them in a private cell so they can beat each other to death and at the same time can put a finish line to rowdyism. But instead, Gemeni convinces Ladda to plead Narendranath Chowdary to give them a chance to lead a normal life. Gemeni's trick works and they both are given a chance. While Gemeni changes his life, Ladda does not change his life. He keeps on disturbing Gemeni and wants him to help him out in his business. But instead, Gemeni informs about Ladda and his activities to Narendranath Chowdary. So, now Ladda is in jail. Meanwhile, Gemeni tries to reunite with Manisha as he had changed now and eventually she does forgive him.

After some months, Chowdary gets transferred as the transport DG of Andhra Pradesh and the new Police Commissioner, Kumaraswamy arrives, but to Gemeni's bad luck he is corrupt and releases Ladda from jail. Now, Ladda and the new Commissioner urge Gemeni to help him in his business. But, he still tries to stay away from them.

Forcing Gemeni to return to his old business, he would later kill Gemeni's right hand and who's also a best friend to him. Then in the climax, Gemeni tricks the Kumaraswamy to kill Ladda. Then, Kumaraswamy is transferred as transport DGP and Viswanath becomes the new Commissioner of Police. The film ends with Gemeni starting to lead a fresh life with Manisha.

Cast

 Venkatesh as "Patamatalanka" Gemeni 
 Namitha as Manisha Natwarlal (credited as Bhairavi)
 Kalabhavan Mani as Ladda
 Kota Srinivasa Rao as Police Commissioner Kumaraswamy
 Murali as Police Commissioner Narendranath Chowdary / Transport DG
 Brahmanandam as Car Mechanic
 Posani Krishna Murali as Hand
 Sudhakar as Kanna
 Mumtaj as Kamini
 Sujatha as Annamma	
 Venu Madhav as Car Mechanic		  	
 Ahuti Prasad as ASP
 Gundu Hanumantha Rao 
 Krishna Bhagavan
 Chittajalu Lakshmipati as Gemeni's lawyer
 Raghu Babu as Krishna Babu
 Raghunatha Reddy as Night College Principal
 Vizag Prasad as Kandula Satyam
 Surya	as Annamma's slain son and Ladda's gang member
 Kadambari Kiran as Manikyam
 Devi Charan as College student
 TK Hari 
 Kandal Rao 
 Babar 
 Balaji 
 Bhargav 
 Ramana 
 Chandu 
 Ramesh 
 Murali 
 Madhu 
 Radha Krishna 
 Sravan Kumar 
 Nagaraju 
 Srikanth Rao 
 Anil 
 Pavan 
 Ashalata 
 Preethi 
 Manu Shetty

Soundtrack

Music composed by RP Patnaik (referred to as S. P. Patnayak).
Music released on Aditya Music Company.

References

External links 
 

2000s Telugu-language films
2002 films
Films directed by Saran
Telugu remakes of Tamil films